Earl of Denbigh (pronounced 'Denby') is a title in the Peerage of England. It was created in 1622 for William Feilding, 1st Viscount Feilding, a courtier, admiral, adventurer, and brother-in-law of the powerful Duke of Buckingham. The title is named after the Welsh town of Denbigh in the county of Denbighshire. Since the time of the third earl (1640), the Earl of Denbigh has also held the title of Earl of Desmond, in the Peerage of Ireland.

The family seat is Newnham Paddox, in the parish of Monks Kirby, Warwickshire. The eighth earl converted to Roman Catholicism during the 1850s, in which faith the family has remained. The earldom was one of the hereditary peerages whose entitlement to sit in the House of Lords was removed by the House of Lords Act 1999.

The origins of the Feilding family
The Feilding family have been Lords of Newnham Paddox in Monks Kirby, Warwickshire, since 1433. They are also descended from the Newnham family (named from the estate) who held Newnham Paddox in the 1100s and 1200s (see Monks Kirby).

Originally a family of minor Midlands gentry, following their elevation to the peerage in the early 17th century, the Feildings began to claim descent from the Habsburgs through the counts of Laufenburg and Rheinfelden. The claim was researched by historians Edward Gibbon and William Dugdale, and it was widely accepted for centuries but was also subject to ridicule. The claim was debunked around the turn of the 20th century by J. Horace Round.

Creation of the titles of Earl of Denbigh and Earl of Desmond

William, the first earl of Denbigh, owed his elevation in court and to the peerage primarily to his marriage with Susan Villiers. The Villiers family were also minor Midlands gentry until Susan's brother, George Villiers, became the confidant and lover of King James I and was granted the dukedom of Buckingham. Hugely powerful, George Villiers showered preferment on his family: not only was William Feilding made Earl of Denbigh, but William's eight-year-old second son (named George after his important uncle) was given the right to an additional earldom – that of Desmond.

William Feilding, the First Earl of Denbigh
William Feilding was Master of the Great Wardrobe under King James I and also took part in the Expedition to Cádiz of 1625. Feilding had already been created Baron Feilding, of Newnham Paddox in the County of Warwick, and Viscount Feilding in 1620 before being made Earl of Denbigh in 1622. All three titles are in the Peerage of England.

Basil Feilding, the Second Earl of Denbigh
Lord Denbigh was succeeded by his eldest son, Basil, the second Earl. In contrast to his father, he fought as a Parliamentarian in the Civil War. In 1664 he was created Baron St Liz in the Peerage of England, with remainder to the heirs male of his father.

George Feilding, the First Earl of Desmond (4th Creation)
William's second son was the Hon. George Feilding. In 1622, when George was around 8 years old, James I created him Baron Fielding, of Lecaghe in the County of Tipperary, and Viscount Callan, of Callan in the County of Kilkenny. At the same time, George was given the right to the title Earl of Desmond as and when the previous holder of that title died without an heir. That happened in 1628. All three titles were in the Peerage of Ireland. Earl of Desmond is an ancient Irish title, the 1628 award was its 4th, and current creation.

Earls of Denbigh (1st creation) and Earls of Desmond (4th creation)
Basil, the second earl of Denbigh, died childless and was succeeded by his nephew, William Feilding, 2nd Earl of Desmond, who now also became the third Earl of Denbigh (he also succeeded in the barony of St Liz by special remainder).

Basil, the fourth Earl of Denbigh, served as Lord-Lieutenant of Leicestershire and Denbighshire. Rudolph, the eight earl (the name Rudolph began to be used by the family on the basis of their fictitious claim to Habsburg ancestry - see above) was a notable member of the Oxford Movement and converted to Roman Catholicism. The family have continued in the Catholic faith, becoming one of the pre-eminent English Catholic families.  The ninth Earl, served as a Lord-in-waiting (government whip in the House of Lords) from 1897 to 1905 in the Conservative administrations of Lord Salisbury and Arthur Balfour. The eleventh earl, under the name Rollo Feilding, raced sports cars

Since the third earl, the titles have descended from father to son, with the exception of the seventh earl and tenth earl who inherited the title from their grandfathers.

The title is currently held by the twelfth earl, who succeeded his father in 1995.  Lord Denbigh is Grand Carver of England.

List of Earls of Denbigh and Earls of Desmond

William Feilding, 3rd Earl of Denbigh and 2nd Earl of Desmond (1640–1685)
Basil Feilding, 4th Earl of Denbigh and 3rd Earl of Desmond (1668–1717)
William Feilding, 5th Earl of Denbigh and 4th Earl of Desmond (1697–1755)
Basil Feilding, 6th Earl of Denbigh and 5th Earl of Desmond (1719–1800)
William Robert Feilding, Viscount Feilding (1760–1799)
William Basil Percy Feilding, 7th Earl of Denbigh and 6th Earl of Desmond (1796–1865)
Rudolph William Basil Feilding, 8th Earl of Denbigh and 7th Earl of Desmond (1823–1892)
Rudolph Robert Basil Aloysius Augustine Feilding, 9th Earl of Denbigh and 8th Earl of Desmond (1859–1939)
Rudolph Edmund Aloysius Feilding, Viscount Feilding (1885–1937)
William Rudolph Stephen Feilding, 10th Earl of Denbigh and 9th Earl of Desmond (1912–1966)
William Rudolph Michael Feilding, 11th Earl of Denbigh and 10th Earl of Desmond (1943–1995)
Alexander Stephen Rudolph Feilding, 12th Earl of Denbigh and 11th Earl of Desmond (b. 1970)

The heir apparent is the present holder's son, Peregrine Rudolph Henry Feilding, Viscount Feilding (b. 2005).

Notable  members of the Feilding Family
 Lady Elizabeth Feilding, daughter of the first Earl of Denbigh, was created Countess of Guilford for life in 1660.
 Lady Dorothie Mary Evelyn Feilding-Moore, MM (6 October 1889 – 24 October 1935), daughter of the ninth earl, was a volunteer nurse and ambulance driver on the Western Front during World War I.

Children of Edmund Feilding, grandson of the 3rd Earl 
Edmund Feilding was the third son of John Feilding, the youngest son of the 3rd earl. He had three notable children all of whom chose to spell their surname in the more conventional fashion as "Fielding": 
 The writer and magistrate Henry Fielding, son of Edmund, is the most famous member of the Feilding family.
 Sarah Fielding, sister of Henry, was also a well-known author.
 John Fielding, half-brother of Henry and Sarah, was a celebrated blind magistrate (having served as assistant to Henry). Through the regular circulation of a police gazette containing descriptions of known criminals, John Fielding established the basis for the first police criminal records department.

Children of the 7th Earl 
 The Hon. Sir Percy Robert Basil Feilding was a General in the Army and fought in the Crimean War.
 General William Henry Adelbert Feilding (6 January 1836 – 25 March 1895) was a British soldier of the Coldstream Guards who founded the town of Feilding, New Zealand.

References

Sources

External links
Newnam Paddox Art Park

Earldoms in the Peerage of England
Denbigh
1622 establishments in England
Noble titles created in 1622